Brezovica, fully Brezovica nad Torysou is a village and municipality in Sabinov District in the Prešov Region of north-eastern Slovakia.

History 
In historical records the village was first mentioned in 1317 as Berzeuice.

Geography 

The municipality lies at an altitude of 456 metres (1525.59 feet) and covers an area of 18.235 km² (7 mi²). It has a population of about 1700 people.

People 
 Berzeviczy family

Genealogical resources

The records for genealogical research are available at the state archive "Statny Archiv in Presov, Slovakia"

 Roman Catholic church records (births/marriages/deaths): 1838-1896 (parish A)
 Greek Catholic church records (births/marriages/deaths): 1810-1907 (parish B)

See also
 List of municipalities and towns in Slovakia

External links 
 https://web.archive.org/web/20071116010355/http://www.statistics.sk/mosmis/eng/run.html
 https://web.archive.org/web/20080607024135/http://www.panoramio.com/user/1812699/tags/Brezovica
 https://www.youtube.com/watch?v=ht3tYBfqBgQ
Surnames of living people in Brezovica

Villages and municipalities in Sabinov District
Šariš